Players and pairs who neither have high enough rankings nor receive wild cards may participate in a qualifying tournament held one week before the annual Wimbledon Tennis Championships.

Seeds

  Ivo Heuberger /  Michael Kohlmann (first round)
  Nathan Healey /  Jordan Kerr (qualifying competition)
  Daniel Melo /  Alexandre Simoni (first round)
  James Blake /  Mark Merklein (qualified)
  Sander Groen /  Alexander Waske (first round)
  Jonathan Erlich /  Andy Ram (qualified)
  Antonio Prieto /  André Sá (first round)
  Marcos Ondruska /  Damien Roberts (qualifying competition)

Qualifiers

  Brandon Hawk /  Grant Silcock
  Jonathan Erlich /  Andy Ram
  Kevin Kim /  Glenn Weiner
  James Blake /  Mark Merklein

Qualifying draw

First qualifier

Second qualifier

Third qualifier

Fourth qualifier

External links

2001 Wimbledon Championships – Men's draws and results at the International Tennis Federation

Men's Doubles Qualifying
Wimbledon Championship by year – Men's doubles qualifying